Cambridge  is a electoral ward in the Metropolitan Borough of Sefton in Merseyside, England. It is in the Southport Parliamentary constituency which covers the locality of Marshside in the town of Southport.

Councillors
 indicates seat up for re-election.

Election results

References

Wards of the Metropolitan Borough of Sefton